WPKG is a server-based software package designed to allow the deployment of software and other packages to networked Microsoft Windows computers based on a set of rules, without end user intervention.  As such, the program aims to make the administration of networked computers easier for the administrator, allowing security patches, new programs and updates to be installed on the connected computers without having to physically visit each computer.

WPKG is open-source software licensed under the GPL.

See also
Ninite
NuGet
ProGet
Microsoft System Center Configuration Manager
Windows Deployment Services
Windows Assessment and Deployment Kit

References 

Configuration management